Bayanbulag (rich spring) is a sum (district) of Bayankhongor Province in southern Mongolia. In 2006, its population was 2,143.

Climate

Bayanbulag has a cold semi-arid climate (Köppen climate classification BSk) with mild summers and severely cold winters. The climate is very dry; most precipitation falls in the summer as rain, with some snow in the adjacent months of May and September. Winters are very dry.

References

Populated places in Mongolia
Districts of Bayankhongor Province